Saints Peter and Paul Church  is a Roman Catholic Church in San Francisco's North Beach neighborhood. Located at 666 Filbert Street, it is directly across from Washington Square and is administered by the Salesians of Don Bosco. It is known as "la cattedrale italiana dell'Ovest", or the Italian Cathedral of the West (the use of the word "Cathedral" is merely colloquial, not an official designation),  and has served as the home church and cultural center for San Francisco's Italian-American community since its consecration. It offers English, Italian, and Cantonese-language services.

History
The first Saints Peter and Paul Church, built in 1884 on the corner of Filbert Street and Grant Avenue, was destroyed by the Great Quake of 1906. Construction on the current building was completed in 1924.

During 1926–27, the church was the target of radical anti-catholic anarchists, who instituted five separate bomb attacks against the building in the space of one year.  On March 6, 1927, police shot and killed one man and seriously wounded another, Celsten Eklund, a radical anarchist and local soapbox orator, as the two men attempted to light the fuse of a large dynamite bomb in front of the church.  The dead man, known only as 'Ricca', was never fully identified; Eklund died of his wounds some time later without giving any information about his co-conspirators.

In recent years, Saints Peter and Paul has also become the home church for the city's Chinese-American Roman Catholic population, offering weekly masses in Italian, Cantonese, and English.  Mass in Latin is offered monthly as well.

Saints Peter and Paul serves the Archdiocese of San Francisco.

In popular culture

The church is prominently featured in the Clint Eastwood movies Dirty Harry (the Church, and nearby Dante Building, are the scene of sniper attacks by the "Scorpio Killer") and The Dead Pool. Scenes from Cecil B. DeMille's 1923 version of The Ten Commandments were filmed at the church while it was under construction. Also featured in What's Up, Doc? in which Judy Maxwell, portrayed by Barbra Streisand and Dr. Howard Bannister, portrayed by Ryan O'Neal borrowed a Volkswagen Beetle during a car chase. Parts of Sister Act 2 were also filmed here. Both the exterior and the interior of the church were prominently featured in the movie Getting Even With Dad, starring Macaulay Culkin.

After their civil ceremony in 1954, Marilyn Monroe and Joe DiMaggio returned for photographs on the steps of this church. DiMaggio was married to Dorothy Arnold in the church on November 19, 1939, but later divorced. Still married as far as the Church was concerned (having not obtained an annullment), he could not be married in the Catholic Church. In a side entrance, Sts. Peter and Paul Church still showcases a photo in a book displaying proudly DiMaggio's marriage day photo—but with Arnold, not Monroe.  DiMaggio's funeral was held here on March 11, 1999, officiated by lifelong family friend and confidant, Armand Oliveri, S.D.B., who politely refuses all interviews or requests to discuss any intimate details of Monroe's or DiMaggio's life.

American pop singer Michelle Lambert considers this church her spiritual home, and even portrayed Mary in “Las Posadas de San Francisco,” parade in 2010.

In the 2015 disaster film San Andreas, the church and Washington Square was seen being hit by a tsunami as it reaches North Beach.

The protagonist of Wendell Berry's novella Remembering, Andy Catlett, walks by the church and reads the Italian inscription over its portal: the opening lines of Dante's Paradisio.

References

External links

Saints Peter and Paul website

Anarchism in the United States
Anti-Catholicism in the United States
Atheism and violence
Attacks on churches in North America
Church bombings
Roman Catholic churches in San Francisco
Landmarks in San Francisco
North Beach, San Francisco
Roman Catholic churches in California
Violence against Christians